General (Retd.) Iqbal Karim Bhuiyan (born 2 June 1957) is a retired Bangladeshi general who served as the Chief of Army Staff of the Bangladesh Army from 2012 to 2015. He took office at 25 June 2012 and retired on 25 June 2015. He joined Bangladesh Military Academy on 19 March 1976 and was commissioned on 30 November 1976 in the Corps of Infantry (East Bengal Regiment). Iqbal had a diversified and fine mix of all three types of appointment available in Army. During 39 years in Bangladesh Army, He commanded three Infantry Battalions, an Infantry Brigade and three Infantry Divisions. He also served as Chief of General Staff, Colonel Staff of Bangladesh Army, and Platoon Commander of Military Academy.He also participated in Operation Desert Storm and received Liberation of Kuwait Medal.

Early life and education
Bhuiyan was born in Comilla on 2 June 1957 and studied in Comilla Zilla School and Faujdarhat Cadet College. Bhuiyan has participated courses abroad which includes Company Commander's Course in Malaysia, Course on Peace-Keeping for Decision Makers in the Defence Institute of International Legal Studies in Rhode Island, US. He is a graduate of Defense Services Command and Staff College and United States Army Command and General Staff College.

Career 
Bhuiyan entered into Bangladesh Military Academy on 19 March 1976 at 3rd BMA SSC course and was commissioned on 30 November 1976 in East Bengal Regiment.Bhuiyan held important positions in the Bangladesh Army including Platoon Commander in Bangladesh Military Academy, Colonel Staff of 11 Infantry Division, Bogra, Commander of 105 Infantry Brigade and Director of Staff of Defence Services Command and Staff College. Bhuiyan actively took part in Operation Desert Storm and received the Kuwait Liberation Medal from Government of Kuwait.

He served as Commandant of Defence Services Command and Staff College, Commandant of the School of Infantry and Tactics (S I & T), Sylhet, Commander of BANSEC-2, and United Nations Peacekeeping Mission in Liberia (UNAMSIL).

He was GOC of the 19th Infantry Division, Ghatail, the 24th Infantry Division, and  CGS (Chief of General staff) of Bangladesh Army. He was the chief of General Staff of Bangladesh Army in 2007. In 2009, he was the Commandant of the Military Command & Staff College when he was appointed General officer commanding of the 9th Infantry Division, Savar Cantonment. He was the Quarter Master General of Bangladesh Army in 2010 after being promoted to lieutenant general in May 2010. He was the chairman of Bangladesh Diesel Plant Limited.

Bhuiyan was appointed of Chief of Army Staff in June 2012 replacing General Md Abdul Mubeen. Bhuiyan was promoted to full general on the day he took office of Chief of Army Staff of Bangladesh Army on 25 June 2012. He invited indian soldier in October to visit Bangladesh. In November 2012, he held a reception for veterans of Bangladesh Liberation War. In 2013, he raised the flags of 32nd Infantry Regiment and 33rd Bangladesh Infantry Regiment, two new infantry units, based in Jalalabad Cantonment.

Bhuiyan hosted General Vincent Brooks of the United States Army Pacific command in 2014 during the Pacific Armies Management Seminar.

Bhuiyan inaugurated Bangladesh Golf Academy in 2015 at the Army Golf Club. On 25 June 2015, General Abu Belal Muhammad Shafiul Huq replaced Bhuiyan as the Chief of Army Staff.

Honours

Family 
Bhuiyan is married to Tahmina Yasmin and the couple is blessed with two daughters and one son.

References

1957 births
Living people
People from Comilla District
Chiefs of Army Staff, Bangladesh
Bangladeshi generals
Bangladesh Army generals
People from Comilla
Faujdarhat Cadet College alumni